Mack Edwin Burk (born April 21, 1935) is an American former professional baseball catcher, who played in Major League Baseball (MLB) for the  and  Philadelphia Phillies. Of his 16 big league game appearances, 13 were as a pinch runner, two as a pinch hitter, and only one inning as a catcher. 

He attended the University of Texas at Austin and signed a $40,000 bonus contract with the Phillies in September 1955. Under the rules of the day, a "bonus baby" such as Burk was compelled to spend his first two years as a professional baseball player on a Major League roster. In his pro debut, on May 25, 1956, Burk pinch-ran for catcher Andy Seminick, in a home game against the Pittsburgh Pirates at Connie Mack Stadium. In Burk’s third game, on June 5, he pinch hit for pitcher Curt Simmons in the fifth inning and singled off left-hander Joe Nuxhall of the Cincinnati Redlegs. Burk came around to score his first big-league run that inning on a sacrifice fly by Stan Lopata. Burk scored two more runs during the 1956 season, both as a pinch runner. In his lone appearance in the field, Burk caught one inning, the bottom of the eighth, in relief of Lopata on July 15 against the St. Louis Cardinals, and handled one chance flawlessly.

Burk missed the entire 1957 season due to military service. But in 1958, he returned to baseball and was able to gain much-needed playing time in minor league baseball. Burk also played in one game with the Phillies. In his second big-league plate appearance and at bat, Burk was called upon to pinch hit for Phils' pitcher Ray Semproch in the 14th inning of a game against the San Francisco Giants, and he was called out on strikes against veteran Johnny Antonelli. It would be Burk's final MLB appearance.  All told, he collected three runs scored, and one single in his two at bats for a career batting average of .500.

Burk continued his career in the minors through 1960 in the Phillies' farm system before leaving pro baseball.

References

External links

1935 births
Living people
Asheville Tourists players
Baseball players from Texas
Buffalo Bisons (minor league) players
Major League Baseball catchers
People from Nacogdoches, Texas
Philadelphia Phillies players
Texas Longhorns baseball players
Tulsa Oilers (baseball) players
Williamsport Grays players